St. Andrews School is a preparatory and secondary independent school situated near Nakuru, Kenya near the town of Molo. It is located in Turi and often referred to by that name.

Notable alumni

Moses Arita, Kenya international footballer
Douglas Carswell, Independent Member of UK Parliament
Margaret Gakuo Kenyatta, former first lady of Kenya

References

Related links
 School website

Boarding schools in Kenya
Educational institutions established in 1931
Education in Rift Valley Province
Nakuru
Cricket grounds in Kenya
International schools in Kenya
1931 establishments in the British Empire